Mike Morrison (born 31 October 1989) is an American professional basketball player for Keravnos of the Cypriot League. He has also played professionally in Belgium, Cyprus, Finland, Lithuania, Germany and Greece.

Career
Morrison started his career in 2012 with the Antwerp Giants.

In the summer of 2017, Morrison played in The Basketball Tournament on ESPN for The Stickmen. He competed for the $2 million prize, and for The Stickmen, he averaged 8.5 points per game. Morrison helped take The Stickmen to the second round of the tournament, where they then lost to Team Challenge ALS 87–73.

Morrison spent the 2017–18 season back with Skyliners Frankfurt in the Basketball Bundesliga. He averaged 8.4 points and 4.5 rebounds per game.

On August 11, 2018, he signed with BC Lietkabelis.

In November 2018, Morrison signed a six-week contract with S.Oliver Würzburg of the German Bundesliga. His contract was extended to the end of the season.

On August 2, 2019, Morrison signed with Peristeri of the Greek Basket League.

On August 23, 2020, Mike Morrison signed with Semt77 Yalovaspor of the Turkish Basketball First League.

Personal
He has a step-brother named Zachary Morrison in the United States.

References

External links
Real GM Profile
George Mason Patriots bio
Eurobasket.com Profile
His New Team's IG Post

1989 births
Living people
American expatriate basketball people in Belgium
American expatriate basketball people in Cyprus
American expatriate basketball people in Finland
American expatriate basketball people in Germany
American men's basketball players
Antwerp Giants players
APOEL B.C. players
Basketball players from St. Petersburg, Florida
BC Lietkabelis players
George Mason Patriots men's basketball players
Kataja BC players
Power forwards (basketball)
S.Oliver Würzburg players
Skyliners Frankfurt players
ASEAN Basketball League players